{{DISPLAYTITLE:Omicron2 Centauri}}

Omicron2 Centauri (ο2 Cen, ο2 Centauri) is a star in the constellation Centaurus.

ο2 Centauri is a white A-type supergiant with a mean apparent magnitude of +5.12.  It is approximately 7,000 light years from Earth.  It is classified as an Alpha Cygni type variable star and its brightness varies from magnitude +5.12 to +5.22 with a period of 46.3 days.

In 1996, Kaufer and colleagues calculated Omicron2 Centauri to be around 136,000 times as luminous, 18 times as massive and have 131 times the diameter of the Sun.

ο2 Cen forms a close naked eye pair with ο1 Cen, another 5th magnitude supergiant.

References 

Alpha Cygni variables
Centauri, Omicron2
Centaurus (constellation)
A-type supergiants
4442
100262
056250
Durchmusterung objects